The 2021 WNBA season was the 14th season for the Atlanta Dream of the Women's National Basketball Association. The team began the season on May 14, 2021 at home against the Connecticut Sun.

This was the first season that the Dream will play home games at the Gateway Center Arena at College Park.  In the 2019 offseason the team elected to move from State Farm Arena.  However, due to the COVID-19 pandemic, the 2020 season was played at a neutral site.

Mike Petersen began the season as interim head coach, but stepped down on July 24 due to health reasons. Darius Taylor took over as interim coach through the end of the regular season.

The Dream began the season by losing their first two games, but then going on a four game winning streak.  That win streak was followed by a four game losing streak.  After winning their next game, the Dream were 5–6 through their first eleven games.  However, the Dream could only win one more of their next eight games to go into the Olympic break with a record of 6–13. The team's struggles continued after the break as they lost seven straight games. They did manage to win two of their last five games to finish with an 8–24 record.

Transactions

WNBA Draft

Trades and Roster Changes

Roster

Depth

Schedule

Preseason

|- style="background:#bbffbb;"
| 1
| May 1
| Minnesota
| W 69–61
| ParkerSims (12)
| Monique Billings (7)
| Courtney Williams (5)
| Gateway Center Arena0
| 1–0
|- style="background:#bbffbb;"
| 2
| May 5
| @ Washington
| W 87–80
| BillingsSims (13)
| Monique Billings (7)
| WilliamsMcDonaldBradford (2)
| Entertainment and Sports Arena0
| 2–0

 The preseason game vs. Minnesota was a scrimmage. The second half gave both teams multiple possessions and was not played like a real game.

Regular season

|- style="background:#fcc;"
| 1
| May 14
| Connecticut
| L 67–78
| SimsC. Williams  (14)
| BillingsBradford (5)
| Courtney Williams (4)
| Gateway Center Arena561
| 0–1
|- style="background:#fcc;"
| 2
| May 19
| Chicago
| L 77–85
| Courtney Williams (24)
| BillingsC. Williams (8)
| Chennedy Carter (6)
| Gateway Center Arena689
| 0–2
|- style="background:#cfc;"
| 3
| May 21
| @ Indiana
| W 83–79
| Chennedy Carter (23)
| Monique Billings (7)
| CarterC. Williams (4)
| Bankers Life Fieldhouse
| 1–2
|- style="background:#cfc;"
| 4
| May 25
| @ Chicago
| W 90–83
| Tiffany Hayes (26)
| Monique Billings (7)
| Aari McDonald (5)
| Wintrust Arena1,004
| 2–2
|- style="background:#cfc;"
| 5
| May 27
| Dallas
| W 101–95
| Tiffany Hayes (26)
| Monique Billings (11)
| Courtney Williams (5)
| Gateway Center Arena711
| 3–2
|- style="background:#cfc;"
| 6
| May 29
| @ New York
| W 90–87
| Courtney Williams (31)
| Courtney Williams (12)
| Courtney Williams (7)
| Barclays Center1,235
| 4–2

|- style="background:#fcc;"
| 7
| June 4
| @ Minnesota
| L 84-86
| Tiffany Hayes (23)
| Courtney Williams (10)
| Odyssey Sims (6)
| Target Center2,024
| 4–3
|- style="background:#fcc;"
| 8
| June 6
| @ Minnesota
| L 80–100
| Tiffany Hayes (21)
| Monique Billings (6)
| Courtney Williams (5)
| Target Center2,021
| 4–4
|- style="background:#fcc;"
| 9
| June 9
| Seattle
| L 71–95
| Tiffany Hayes (22)
| Elizabeth Williams (12)
| Courtney Williams (6)
| Gateway Center Arena1,014
| 4–5
|- style="background:#fcc;"
| 10
| June 11
| Seattle
| L 75–86
| Courtney Williams (19)
| Courtney Williams (11)
| HayesSims (4)
| Gateway Center Arena1,405
| 4–6
|- style="background:#cfc;"
| 11
| June 13
| Washington
| W 101–78
| Courtney Williams (21)
| Elizabeth Williams (7)
| Tiffany Hayes (6)
| Gateway Center Arena1,122
| 5–6
|- style="background:#fcc;"
| 12
| June 17
| @ Washington
| L 93–96
| Odyssey Sims (22)
| Tianna Hawkins (9)
| Odyssey Sims (7)
| Entertainment and Sports Arena2,100
| 5–7
|- style="background:#fcc;"
| 13
| June 23
| Minnesota
| L 85–87
| Courtney Williams (24)
| ParkerE. Williams (7)
| Cheyenne Parker (5)
| Gateway Center Arena907
| 5–8
|- style="background:#fcc;"
| 14
| June 26
| New York
| L 78–101
| Chennedy Carter (24)
| Monique Billings (9)
| SimsC. Williams (4)
| Gateway Center Arena1,605
| 5–9
|- style="background:#cfc;"
| 15
| June 29
| New York
| W 73–69
| Courtney Williams (18)
| BillingsBradford (7)
| CarterC. Williams (4)
| Gateway Center Arena1,131
| 6–9

|- style="background:#fcc;"
| 16
| July 2
| @ Seattle
| L 88–91
| Courtney Williams (20)
| BillingsC. Williams (8)
| BradfordC. Williams (7)
| Angel of the Winds Arena3,011
| 6–10
|- style="background:#fcc;"
| 17
| July 4
| @ Las Vegas
| L 95–118
| Courtney Williams (19)
| Cheyenne Parker (7)
| Odyssey Sims (13)
| Michelob Ultra Arena2,705
| 6–11
|- style="background:#fcc;"
| 18
| July 9
| @ Connecticut
| L 72–84
| Cheyenne Parker (15)
| ParkerSims (6)
| McDonaldSimsC. Williams (3)
| Mohegan Sun Arena2,286
| 6–12
|- style="background:#fcc;"
| 19
| July 11
| Indiana
| L 68–79
| Odyssey Sims (20)
| Elizabeth Williams (7)
| Courtney Williams (5)
| Gateway Center Arena1,897
| 6–13

|- style="background:#fcc;"
| 20
| August 15
| @ Phoenix
| L 81–92
| Courtney Williams (30)
| Monique Billings (8)
| Courtney Williams (6)
| Phoenix Suns Arena7,491
| 6–14
|- style="background:#fcc;"
| 21
| August 17
| @ Los Angeles
| L 80–85 (OT)
| Odyssey Sims (26)
| Courtney Williams (9)
| Odyssey Sims (6)
| Staples Center2,200
| 6–15
|- style="background:#fcc;"
| 22
| August 19
| @ Los Angeles
| L 64–66
| Courtney Williams (23)
| Courtney Williams (11)
| Courtney Williams (4)
| Staples Center1,885
| 6–16
|- style="background:#fcc;"
| 23
| August 21
| Phoenix
| L 69–84
| Odyssey Sims (16)
| Courtney Williams (7)
| Courtney Williams (4)
| Gateway Center Arena2,073
| 6–17
|- style="background:#fcc;"
| 24
| August 24
| Chicago
| L 79–86
| Odyssey Sims (17)
| Monique Billings (8)
| Odyssey Sims (5)
| Gateway Center Arena1,292
| 6–18
|- style="background:#fcc;"
| 25
| August 26
| Las Vegas
| L 71–78
| Monique Billings (21)
| HayesC. Williams (8)
| Courtney Williams (5)
| Gateway Center Arena2,182
| 6–19

|- style="background:#fcc;"
| 26
| September 2
| @ Dallas
| L 68–72
| Courtney Williams (25)
| Monique Billings (11)
| Courtney Williams (7)
| College Park Center1,975
| 6–20
|- style="background:#cfc;"
| 27
| September 5
| @ Dallas
| W 69–64
| Tiffany Hayes (22)
| Monique Billings (14)
| Monique Billings (4)
| College Park Center2,386
| 7–20
|- style="background:#fcc;"
| 28
| September 8
| Phoenix
| L 75–76
| Courtney Williams (20)
| Courtney Williams (14)
| Courtney Williams (5)
| Gateway Center Arena1,215
| 7–21
|- style="background:#fcc;"
| 29
| September 10
| @ Washington
| L 74–82
| Courtney Williams (23)
| Monique Billings (10)
| Tiffany Hayes (6)
| Entertainment and Sports Arena2,320
| 7–22
|- style="background:#cfc;"
| 30
| September 14
| Indiana
| W 85–78
| Tiffany Hayes (31)
| Courtney Williams (11)
| Aari McDonald (6)
| Gateway Center Arena1,208
| 8–22
|- style="background:#fcc;"
| 31
| September 16
| Los Angeles
| L 68–74
| Tiffany Hayes (25)
| Courtney Williams (10)
| HayesSims (3)
| Gateway Center Arena2,537
| 8–23
|- style="background:#fcc;"
| 32
| September 19
| @ Connecticut
| L 64–84
| Courtney Williams (18)
| BillingsC. Williams (6)
| Aari McDonald (4)
| Mohegan Sun Arena4,724
| 8–24

Standings

Statistics

Regular season

Source:

Awards and honors

References

External links
The Official Site of the Atlanta Dream

Atlanta Dream seasons
Atlanta
Atlanta Dream